Edward Geoffrey Luce (born 1 June 1968) is an English journalist and the Financial Times chief US commentator and columnist based in Washington, D.C.

Early life and education
Luce is the son of Rose Helen (born Nicholson) and Richard Luce, Baron Luce. His father is the former Lord Chamberlain to the Queen (2000 to 2006), former Governor of Gibraltar, a Conservative Member of Parliament (MP) (1971 to 1992), government minister, and a crossbench member of the House of Lords. His paternal grandfather is Sir William Luce, Governor and Commander-in-Chief of Aden, Political Resident in the Gulf and Special Representative to the Foreign Secretary (Lord Home) for Gulf Affairs. His great-uncle is admiral Sir David Luce, First Sea Lord (1963–1966). His maternal great-grandfather is vice-admiral Sir Trevylyan Napier, who was the Commander-in-Chief, America and West Indies Station (1919–1920). His first cousin is actress Miranda Hart.  

Luce completed his secondary education at various boarding schools around Sussex, graduated with a degree in Philosophy, Politics and Economics from New College, Oxford, in 1990, and received a post-graduate diploma in newspaper journalism from City University, London.

Career
Luce's first job was as a correspondent for The Guardian in Geneva, Switzerland.

Luce joined the Financial Times in 1995 and initially reported from the Philippines, after which he took a one-year sabbatical working in Washington, D.C., as speechwriter for Lawrence Summers, then U.S. Treasury Secretary (1999–2001) during the Clinton administration.

Luce was the Financial Times' Washington bureau chief and South Asia bureau chief based in New Delhi before he became the paper's chief US commentator and columnist. In connection with his job he hosts interviews which are published on YouTube with statesmen and famous businesspeople.

Luce is also the author, along with colleague Rana Foroohar, of the weekly Swamp Notes newsletter, which covers the intersection of money, power, and politics in America.

Published works

Personal life
Luce was married to New Delhi-raised Priya Basu, they divorced in March of 2015. He married Niamh King in June of 2017 in Chicago .

References

External links

 Twitter
 Ed Luce on PBS NewsHour
 

1968 births
Alumni of New College, Oxford
British male journalists
British non-fiction writers
Living people
Financial Times people
Younger sons of barons